Adolfo Zamora Cruz (born 12 November 1949) is a Mexican politician from the Institutional Revolutionary Party. From 2000 to 2003 he served as Deputy of the LVIII Legislature of the Mexican Congress representing Chiapas.

References

1949 births
Living people
Politicians from Chiapas
Institutional Revolutionary Party politicians
21st-century Mexican politicians
People from Tapachula
Municipal presidents in Chiapas
Deputies of the LVIII Legislature of Mexico
Members of the Chamber of Deputies (Mexico) for Chiapas